Joseph Francis Alaskey III (April 17, 1952 – February 3, 2016) was an American actor, broadcaster, impressionist and stand-up comedian.
 
Alaskey was one of Mel Blanc's successors at the Warner Bros. Animation studio until his death. He alternated with Jeff Bergman, Greg Burson, Jim Cummings, Bob Bergen, Maurice LaMarche, and Billy West in voicing Warner Bros. cartoon characters such as Bugs Bunny, Daffy Duck, Porky Pig, Sylvester, Tweety, Elmer Fudd, Yosemite Sam, Foghorn Leghorn, Pepé Le Pew, Marvin the Martian, Speedy Gonzales, Wile E. Coyote and Taz, among many others. He also voiced Plucky Duck on Tiny Toon Adventures from 1990 to 1995. Alaskey was the second actor to voice Grandpa Lou Pickles on the Nickelodeon cartoon Rugrats (taking over after David Doyle's death in 1997). He voiced Lou again in the Rugrats spin-off series All Grown Up!.

Early life
Alaskey was born in Troy, New York, on April 17, 1952 to Joseph Francis Alaskey Jr. and Domenica "Dorothy" De Sorrento De Luca Alaskey. At age 3, he was looking for a pair of sunglasses or people's cigar butts so that he could portray different characters. Alaskey was interested in archeology at the age of ten. After archeology, he was interested in becoming a priest and an English teacher. Alaskey moved to New York City in the 1970s, where he worked in insurance while preparing to become an actor.

Career
After moving to New York City, Alaskey began his show business career as a stand-up comedian and broadcaster. He was occasionally seen onscreen impersonating Jackie Gleason, with whom he shared a physical resemblance. In the 1980s, Gleason personally chose Alaskey to re-record selected dialogue from the "lost episodes" of The Honeymooners found in Gleason's private collection. After Gleason died in 1987, the project was shelved. In 1985, Alaskey provided various voices for Galtar and the Golden Lance. Alaskey was in several television shows including Night Court, Head of the Class, Back to the Future, and Spitting Image: The 1987 Movie Awards. His first major film was Who Framed Roger Rabbit as Yosemite Sam. Alaskey provided a vocal Gleason impersonation in the "Mighty's Wedlock Whimsy" episode of Bakshi-Hyde Ventures' Mighty Mouse: The New Adventures in 1988, and a Cary Grant impersonation in "The Bride of Mighty Mouse" episode from the same season.

Although best known for his ability to successfully impersonate Looney Tunes characters, Alaskey did voice work for non-Warner Bros. characters as well. He has voiced Grandpa Lou Pickles on Rugrats (inheriting the role after David Doyle's death in 1997). He voiced Lou again in the Rugrats spin-off series, All Grown Up!. He also created the voice of Thomas Timberwolf for the internet series TimberWolf, created by animation legend Chuck Jones. He was heard briefly as a voice-over announcer for the Toon Disney channel (and sometimes Dcom extras on Disney Channel). He was the voice of Curt Connors in the Spider-Man 2 video game and Doctor Octopus in Spider-Man: Friend or Foe. Alaskey was in the independent film The Legend of Sasquatch and voiced Mermaid Man in the video games SpongeBob SquarePants: Lights, Camera, Pants! and SpongeBob SquarePants: Creature from the Krusty Krab. He voiced Stinkie in Casper as well as that film's 1996 animated spin-off, The Spooktacular New Adventures of Casper. Alaskey played Beano Froelich in Out of This World but left the show early in its final season, making only infrequent appearances in a few episodes. In the 1980s, he worked as the original announcer on the short-lived game show Couch Potatoes, hosted by Marc Summers. Alaskey made several onscreen appearances, portraying the show's "next door neighbor". For the show's final weeks, he was replaced by Jim McKrell and the "next door neighbor" concept was dropped. During this time, he was also a panelist on The New Hollywood Squares, hosted by John Davidson.

In 2003, he took over the roles of Bugs Bunny and Daffy Duck in the film Looney Tunes: Back in Action. He also, at times, provided the voices for Sylvester, Tweety, and other Looney Tunes characters. Alaskey was the primary voice for Plucky Duck on Tiny Toon Adventures. 

In 2008, Alaskey participated in a unique interview conducted by Logan Leistikow and released by TheYellowMic.com. He answered questions and told his story, then went out onto Hollywood Boulevard and talked to people on the street who wanted to hear his famous voices. This was the first time Alaskey had performed in public in this manner.

In 2014, Alaskey started narrating the television documentary series Murder Comes to Town, which airs on the Investigation Discovery Network.

Alaskey's only leading role in a live-action film was as lovable loser Ron Douglas in the black comedy Lucky Stiff, directed by Anthony Perkins and co-starring Donna Dixon and Jeff Kober.

Death
Alaskey died in Green Island, New York, from cancer on February 3, 2016, at the age of 63. Five days later, his wake was held at St Patricks Cemetery in Watervliet.

Filmography

Film

Animation

Video games

Live-action

Theme parks

Web series

References

External links
 www.joealaskey.com/ (archived copy)
 
 Joe Alaskey  at TV.com 

1952 births
2016 deaths
Actors from Troy, New York
American impressionists (entertainers)
American male video game actors
American male voice actors
Audiobook narrators
Comedians from California
Deaths from cancer in New York (state)
Daytime Emmy Award winners
Male actors from New York (state)
People from Encino, Los Angeles